Doamna Maria Voichița (1457 – 26 February 1511) was a Princess consort of Moldavia (1480–1511).

Life 
Born into the powerful House of Drăculești, Maria was daughter of Radu III the Handsome and his wife, Maria Despina. She was niece of Vlad the Impaler. 

She married Prince Stephen III of Moldavia in 1478. 

She was regarded to have an influence upon the policy of her spouse. 

She is buried in the Putna Monastery, Romania.

Issue
 Bogdan III the One-Eyed, Voivode of Moldavia.
 , who married to Fedor Wiśniowiecki (d. 1533).

References

 George Marcu (coord.), Dicționarul personalităţilor feminine din România, Editura Meronia, București, 2009.

1511 deaths
15th-century Romanian people
16th-century Romanian people
Royal consorts of Moldavia
Year of birth unknown
1457 births
Stephen the Great
15th-century Romanian women
16th-century Romanian women